Lakshmi krishnamurthy (1927/28 – 10 November 2018) was a character actress in Malayalam films. She is known for her role in 1996 Manju warrier starrer film Ee puzhayum kadannu.

Life

Her first film was Hariharans Panchagni, in 1986. Later she acted in Malayalam films like Anantha Bhadram, kaliyoonjal, ponthan mada, pattabhishekham, vismaya thumbathu, piravi, thooval kottaram, vasthuhara, vismayam and mallu singh. she also acted in Kannada movie sanskara, maniratnams Tamil movie kannathil muthamittal and Santhosh Sivan's Hindi movie before the rains.

She was a news reader (first Malayalam News Reader) and dubbing artist at Akashavani Kozhikode. She also acted in a few television serials.

She died on 10 November 2018.

Filmography

 Panjagni (1986) - Debut film in Malayalam
 Thaniyavarthanam (1987)
 Piravi (1989)
 Aksharam (1990) - Short
 Vasthuhara (1991)
 Ponthanmada (1994)
 Sagaram Sakshi (1994)
 Vishnu (1994)
 Sakshyam (1995)
 Ee Puzhayum Kadannu (1996)
 Udhyanapalakan (1996)
 Thoovalkottaram (1996)
 Kaliyoonjal (1997)
 Vismayam (1998)
 Ilamura Thampuran (1998)
 Aaram Jaalakam (2001)
 Kakke Kakke Koodevide (2002)
 Kannathil Muthamittal (2002) - (Tamil)
 Chithrakoodam (2003)
 Kathavasheshan (2004)
 Vismayathumbathu (2004)
 Maanikyan (2005)
 Ananthabhadram (2005)
 Before the Rains (2007) - (English)
 Before the Rains (2008) - (Malayalam)
 Anthiponvettam (2008)
 Keshu (2009)
 Mallu Singh (2012)

Dubbing credits
 Amma (1952) for B. S. Saroja

TV serials
 Naalukettu
 Manasi
 Aalippazham
 Pennurimai

References

Indian actresses
2018 deaths
Actresses in Malayalam cinema
Actresses in Malayalam television
Actresses from Kerala
Actresses in Tamil cinema
Indian voice actresses
Year of birth uncertain